Seafarer's Song (released 2004  in Oslo, Norway on the label EmArcy - 0602498657775) is an album by the Norwegian pianist Ketil Bjørnstad.

Reception
The Allmusic review awarded the album 4 stars.

Track listing 
«Seafarer's Song» (2:30)
«He Struggled To The Surface» (6:27)
«Dying To Get To Europe» (3:58)
«Orion» (4:48)
«Tidal Waves» (6:08)
«How Sweet The Moonlight Sleeps Upon This Bank» (3:44)
«Navigator» (5:18)
«Ung Forelsket Kvinne» (5:41)
«The Beach» (3:40)
«Her Voice» (5:04)
«Dreaming Of The North» (5:41)
«I Had Been Hungry, All The Years» (2:42)
«The Exile's Line» (3:47)
«When Police Came They Also Hit Me» (4:13)
«Refugees At The Rich Man's Gate» (6:22)
«I Many Times Thought Peace Had Come» (3:46)
«The Night Is Darkening Round Me» (5:53)

Personnel 
Ketil Bjørnstad - piano & keyboards
Kristin Asbjørnsen - vocals
Svante Henryson - cello
Nils Petter Molvær - trumpet
Eivind Aarset - guitar
Bjørn Kjellemyr - double bass
Per Lindvall - drums

Notes 
Recorded live at Harstad Kulturhus, Norway, Saturday 21, June 2003, during the festival «Festspillene i Nord-Norge»

References

External links 
 Ketil Bjørnstad Official Website

2004 albums
Ketil Bjørnstad albums
EmArcy Records albums
Universal Music Norway albums